Alfred Street is a street in Oxford, England.

Alfred Street may also refer to:

 Alfred Street (cricket umpire) (1869–1951), English cricketer and umpire
 Alfred Street Baptist Church, Alexandria, Virginia, US
 Alfred Billings Street (1811–1881), American poet

Street, Alfred